
Adams & Co. (c.1860s-1880s) was a publishing firm in Boston, Massachusetts, in the mid-19th century. It specialized in spiritualist authors such as Hudson Tuttle and parlour games such as "Oliver Twist." John S. Adams ran the business, along with George L. Stafford. It operated from offices on Bromfield Street (c.1867-1873), Pearl Street (c.1875) and Tremont Street (c.1880).

Images

Games and novelties
Some of the "games and novelties" issued and/or sold by the firm:

 Budget of Wonders
 The Chopped-Up Monkey
 The Conjuror's Puzzle
 The Cryptograph
 The Electric Cannon
 The Electric Cottage, "... by an explosion without powder or fire this cottage is thrown high in air, the experiment being perfectly safe."
 Eskemo
 The Feast of Flowers, "a floral game of fortune"
 Forced Confessions
 Fun Alive
 Go–Bang, a Japanese Verandah Game; Stay–Bang and Slam–Bang
 The Great Egg-Trick, "as performed by Moulabux, of the Asiatic Troupe at the Crystal Palace, London"
 Humorous Authors
 Invisible Ink
 The Invisible Money-Box
 Invisible Photographs
 Japanese Curiosos
 Japanese Egg
 Japanese Snapping Pictures
 Komikal Konversation Kards
 Labyrinthian Puzzles
 The Love Chase
 The Magi Divination Cards
 The Magic Bottle
 Magic Picture Cards
 The Magic Wonder Telescope
 The Magician's Own Cards
 Match and Catch
 Mixed Pickles
 The Moslem Oracle
 The Most Laughable Thing on Earth
 Mystic Scrolls
 Oliver Twist
 Parlor Ring-Toss
 The Pigeon-Tail Puzzle
 Pocket Conjuring Box
 Popping the Question
 Puzzle Porridge
 Santa Claus Magical Christmas Box
 The Shakesperian Oracle
 The Seven Racers
 The Spiral Puzzle
 The Squirming Fish
 Three Merry Men
 Tom Thumb's Comical Fortune Teller
 Trade and Dicker
 Tumble-Down Dick
 Which is the Largest?
 The Wizard's Pack of Playing Cards
 Zarofiel

Published by Adams & Co.

References

Cultural history of Boston
Publishing companies of the United States
Companies based in Boston
19th century in Boston
Publishing companies established in 1865
Game manufacturers
Novelty items
American companies established in 1865
1865 establishments in Massachusetts